Joe Hickey (7 March 1929 – 11 November 2021) was an Australian rules footballer who played with Fitzroy in the Victorian Football League (VFL).

Family
The son of Daniel James Hickey (1890-1954), and Josephine Marie Hickey (1894-1988), née Wilson, Joseph Hickey was born on 7 March 1929.

He married Audrey May Hoare in 1955.

Joe Hickey’s granddaughter is Australian Olympian Madeline Heiner; and, according to Joe, she acquired all her running ability from him.

Football

Ftitzroy (VFL)
Hickey was a key forward, recruited to Fitzroy from Shepparton.

He made 13 appearances for Fitzroy in 1952, including their preliminary final loss to Collingwood. In 1953 he was Fitzroy's leading goal-kicker with 40 goals, including 8 eight goals against North Melbourne at Brunswick Street Oval.

After Fitzroy
Following the death of his father in a road accident on 25 February 1954, Hickey decided to work at his Invergordon farm full-time.

References

External links
 
 

1929 births
2021 deaths
Australian rules footballers from Victoria (Australia)
Fitzroy Football Club players
Shepparton Football Club players